BioImpacts is a quarterly peer-reviewed open access scientific journal covering all aspects of pharmaceutical and biomedical sciences published by Tabriz University of Medical Sciences. The journal was established in 2011 and the editor-in-chief is Yadollah Omidi (Tabriz University of Medical Sciences).

Abstracting and indexing
The journal is abstracted and indexed in Chemical Abstracts Service, Emerging Sources Citation Index, and Scopus.

References

External links

English-language journals
Pharmacology journals
Publications established in 2011
Quarterly journals
Tabriz University of Medical Sciences